Kazak is a surname of several possible origins. Notable people with this surname include:

 Ali Kazak, Palestinian diplomat
 Andrei Kazak (born 1980), Belarusian sport shooter
 Anne E. Kazak, American clinical psychologist
 Chetin Kazak (born 1972), Bulgarian politician
 Eddie Kazak (1920–1999), American Major League Baseball player
 Levent Kazak, Turkish screenwriter 
 Metin Kazak (born 1972), Bulgarian politician
 Nataliya Kazak (born 1960), Soviet rower
 Yakov Kazak (born 1985), Belarusian retired footballer

See also
 Jēkabs Kazaks (1895–1920), Latvian modernist painter
 Kozak (surname)
 Kazakov
 Kozakov (disambiguation)
 Cossack (disambiguation)
 Kossak